Václav Havel (5 October 1920 – 14 December 1979) was a Czechoslovak slalom and sprint canoeist who competed from the late 1940s to the late 1950s. He was born in Prague (where he also died).

Havel won a silver medal in the C-2 10,000 m event at the 1948 Summer Olympics in London. He also won a bronze medal in the C-2 1,000 m event at the 1950 ICF Canoe Sprint World Championships in Copenhagen.

He also competed in slalom canoeing, winning seven medals at the ICF Canoe Slalom World Championships. This included a gold (C-2 team: 1957), four silvers (C-2: 1957, 1959; C-2 team: 1951, 1959) and two bronzes (C-2: 1951, C-2 team: 1953).

References 

 
 

1920 births
1979 deaths
Canoeists at the 1948 Summer Olympics
Czech male canoeists
Czechoslovak male canoeists
Olympic canoeists of Czechoslovakia
Olympic silver medalists for Czechoslovakia
Olympic medalists in canoeing
ICF Canoe Sprint World Championships medalists in Canadian
Medalists at the 1948 Summer Olympics
Medalists at the ICF Canoe Slalom World Championships
Canoeists from Prague